Eocyclotosaurus (Greek ‘eu’ = proper, true, ‘cyclo’ = circle) is an extinct genus of mastodonsauroid temnospondyl from the Middle Triassic (Anisian). The name Eocyclotosaurus means “true” “round eared lizard”.   Characterized as a capitosauroid with a long and slender snout, closed otic fenestra, and small orbits. It measured over 1 metre and had a 22 cm skull.

They lived between 247 and 242 million years ago in both North America and the British Isles during the early Triassic.

Discovery and naming:

The genus Eocyclotosaurus was discovered by Ortlan in 1970.

Description:

Similarly, to Cyclotosaurus, Eocyclotosaurus have similar morphology in postorbital division of the skull. However, in Eocyclotosaurus the depth of the occiput is greater.

Skull:

Narrow-headed. Orbits were smaller in Eocyclotosaurus and related forms compared to other taxa such as Mastodonsarus who had up to three times the size of smaller eyed taxa. Posteromedial expansion is absent in Eocyclotosaurus, due to anterior snout region being narrower. Premaxillary teeth are transversely elongated. Jaw is heavily reticulated and has a ridge and groove ornamentation of the angular.

Unambiguous autapomorhies:

Tabular horn situated on the side and toward the back of the body / laterally directed and suturing with the squamosal posteriorly. Paraspenoid cultriform process expanded at the base and constricted at mid length. The upper jaw condyle does not join with the quadratojugal. Volmerine plate anterior to the interptergoid cacuities elongate. Parasphenoid cultriform process is deep and thin ventrally. Parasphenoid cultriform process underplated by posterior extension of vomer.

Classification:

The phylogenetic position of the genus Eocyclotosaurus within the capitosaur taxa according to Witzmann et al. (2016)

Paleobiology:

The skull of Eocyclotosaurus was more suited for capturing small prey compared to Cyclotosaurus who was tested to have more capabilities to hunt larger prey. Feeding mechanism and diet: It has been analyzed to capture small prey using a side striking behavior. General scenario for eating heavier for temnospondyls are inferred based on their atomical evidence. Prey would be captured in their teeth, manipulated into swallowing position by their tongue, and swallowed with the assistance of their tongue. The reduction of the cross section  of its skull and the elongation of its nasal bones was an adaptation to reduce drag during lateral movement of the head, increasing the efficiency of aquatic feeding.

Paleoecology:

Habitat. Aquatic fauna

Discovered in the 1980s, Northeastern New Mexico has the most abundant bonebed of Eocyclotosaurus.

Stratigraphic and geographic range:

By the early Anison, most major crown clades were present: heylerosaurids (Eocyclotosaurus), masterodonsaurids, stenotosaurids. The origin of the genus Eocyclotosaurus was at the Spanthaian and Anisian boundery, separate from Cyclotosaurus in the late Ladiunian. Separate evolution suggest separate stratigraphy.

Images:

References

Anisian first appearances
Triassic temnospondyls of Europe
Triassic temnospondyls of North America
Fossil taxa described in 1970
Prehistoric amphibian genera